The Walworth D. Porter Duplex Residence is located in Baraboo, Wisconsin. It was added to the National Register of Historic Places in 1996.

It was deemed significant "as an excellent, highly intact example of a type of Queen Anne style duplex residence that was especially associated with the middle class of its day, a type that was and is a rare part of Baraboo's architectural heritage. The building has all the typical features of a Queen Anne style house of its time such as an irregular plan, a mix of siding materials such as clapboard and decorative wood shingles, porches decorated with turned posts and other features. In addition, the duplex also has a largely original and quite intact interior that adds considerably to the overall significance of the building."

References

Buildings and structures in Sauk County, Wisconsin
Residential buildings on the National Register of Historic Places in Wisconsin
Queen Anne architecture in Wisconsin
Residential buildings completed in 1894
National Register of Historic Places in Sauk County, Wisconsin
Baraboo, Wisconsin